is a biography television series produced by Tsuburaya Productions to commemorate the 25th anniversary of the TDG series Ultraman Tiga, Ultraman Dyna and Ultraman Gaia. Like the series before it, Ultraman Chronicle Zero & Geed, it features Ultraman Zero as the show's main navigator, serving as the bridge to the eras of Tiga and Ultraman Z. It first aired at 9 A.M. on January 9, 2021, on TV Tokyo.

Episodes
Connect to TIGA

ULTRA HIGH

FIGHTING SOUL

Cast
: 
: 
Narrator:

Theme song
"Ultra Spiral"
Lyrics: TAKERU, 
Composition & Arrangement: 
Artist:

Notes

References

External links
Ultraman Chronicle Z: Heroes' Odyssey at TV Tokyo 

2021 Japanese television series debuts
Ultra television series
TV Tokyo original programming